Frédérick Rolette (AOPV 434) will be the fifth  for the Royal Canadian Navy. The class was derived from the Arctic Offshore Patrol Ship project as part of the National Shipbuilding Procurement Strategy and is primarily designed for the patrol and support of Canada's Arctic regions.

It was named to honour the naval hero, Lieutenant Frédérick Rolette.

Design and construction 

The first steel was cut for Frédérick Rolette on 20 May 2021. The keel was laid on 29 June 2022.

References

 

Harry DeWolf-class offshore patrol vessels
Royal Canadian Navy ship names